The Agrarian Party of Greece was a Greek left-wing political party from 1923 to 1946.

History
The party was established in March 1923 at he second Panhellenic Agrarian Congress. In the December 1923 elections it won three seats. In the 1926 elections it won four seats. 

The party did not contest the 1928 elections, but returned in 1936, winning a single seat in the elections that year. The party did not contest any further elections.

On 27 September 1941, the Agricultural Party of Greece participated in the National Liberation Front, the biggest resistance organization during the Greek Resistance.

References

Defunct socialist parties in Greece
National Liberation Front (Greece)
1920s in Greece
1930s in Greece
1940s in Greek politics
Political parties established in 1923
1923 establishments in Greece
Political parties disestablished in 1946
1946 disestablishments in Greece